2001 was a year.

2001 may also refer to:

Film and television
 2001: A Space Odyssey, including:
 2001: A Space Odyssey (film), the science-fiction film directed by Stanley Kubrick
 2001: A Space Odyssey (novel), the science-fiction novel written by Arthur C. Clarke
 2001: A Space Odyssey (soundtrack), soundtrack recording from the Kubrick film
 2001: A Space Odyssey (score), the unused score for the Kubrick film composed by Alex North
 2001: A Space Odyssey (comics), a science-fiction comic written by Jack Kirby
 2001: A Space Travesty, a 2000 comedy film
 2001: A Space Road Odyssey, a 2001 Canadian television series
 2001: Do Hazaar Ek, a 1998 Bollywood film
 2001 (Stargate SG-1), an episode Stargate SG-1

Music
 2001 (Dr. Dre album), 1999
 2001 (Peter Frohmader album), 2001
 Prelude (Deodato album), 1972 (reissued in 1977 as 2001)
 "2001", a song by Melissa Etheridge on her 1992 album Never Enough
 "2001", a song by Foals from their 2022 album Life Is Yours
 2001 (Tokio Hotel album), a 2022 studio album by Tokio Hotel

Other uses
 2001 (pinball), a pinball machine produced by Gottlieb
 2001 Einstein, an asteroid discovered in 1973 and named in honour of Albert Einstein
 2001 Mars Odyssey, NASA Mars probe
 Diario 2001, a Venezuelan daily newspaper
 2001 Club, a former disco nightclub franchise

See also
 MMI (disambiguation) ("MMI" being 2001 in roman numerals)